In Montenegro, the standard time is Central European Time (CET; UTC+01:00). Daylight saving time is observed from the last Sunday in March (02:00 CET) to the last Sunday in October (03:00 CEST). Montenegro has consistently used CET since it gained independence in 2006.

Time notation 
Montenegrins use the 24-hour clock.

IANA time zone database 
In the IANA time zone database, Montenegro is given the zone Europe/Podgorica.

See also 
Time in Europe
Time in Albania
Time in Bosnia and Herzegovina

References

External links 
Current time in Montenegro at Time.is